Al Noor Kassum (11 January 1924 – 18 November 2021) was a Tanzanian politician.

Biography
He was educated in Tanganyika and the United Kingdom, where he was called to the Bar at the Inns of Court in London, Al Noor Kassum was a prominent figure in Tanzanian politics and the Ismaili Muslim community after the country's independence. He held several ministerial positions within the Tanzanian government and was also the East African Community's Minister of Finance and Administration. He held senior positions in UNESCO and at the UN Headquarters in New York. Also he was the 2nd Chancellor of Sokoine University of Agriculture (SUA) in Morogoro Tanzania.

Kassum died in Dar es Salaam on 18 November 2021, at the age of 97.

References

External links
 Speech by President Kikwete at the Launching of Al Noor Kassum's Book

1924 births
2021 deaths
Chama Cha Mapinduzi politicians
Tanganyika African National Union politicians
Tanzanian Ismailis
Tanzanian politicians of Indian descent